Dennis Hawkins (born 22 October 1947) is a Welsh association football inside forward who played professionally in the 1960s and early 1970s, and won six caps for his country's Under 23 side. After developing in the youth team at Leeds United, and realising that his first team chances within such a strong squad would be limited, he left to join Shrewsbury Town. In all he made 58 appearances for the Gay Meadow club. During this period he was loaned to both Chester and Workington.

He finished his league career at Newport.

References

1947 births
Living people
Association football inside forwards
Footballers from Swansea
Welsh footballers
Leeds United F.C. players
Shrewsbury Town F.C. players
Chester City F.C. players
Workington A.F.C. players
Newport County A.F.C. players
Wales under-23 international footballers
English Football League players